Gilbert William Arbuthnot Alexander (Umzinto 7 September 1895 – 10 April 1957, West Finchley, Middlesex, England) was a Scottish first class cricketer. He was the son of Major William Alexander and Ethel Rubina Arbuthnot.

References

External links

1895 births
1957 deaths
People from uMdoni Local Municipality
White South African people
Scottish cricketers
Europeans cricketers
British Army cricketers